Ozark Air Lines was an airline that operated in the United States from 1950 until 1986 when it was purchased by Trans World Airlines (TWA). In 2001, TWA was merged into American Airlines. A smaller regional airline that used the Ozark name (and whose operating certificate was purchased by Great Plains Airlines) operated in 2000–2001. From 1950 until 1986, Ozark's headquarters was located at St. Louis Lambert International Airport.

History

On , Ozark Air Lines was founded to fly services from Springfield, Missouri, and, in January 1945, it began flights between Springfield and St. Louis on Beechcraft Model 17 Staggerwings, replaced by Cessna AT-17 Bobcats in the late 1940s. The required license from the Civil Aeronautics Board (CAB) was not forthcoming and operations had to stop.

In July 1950, Ozark was granted a certificate to operate Parks Air Transport routes not previously activated. In 1955, the airline had 13 DC-3s flying to 35 cities between Sioux City, Indianapolis, Wichita, and Nashville. Ozark's main hub was St. Louis Lambert International Airport. Like other Local Service airlines, it was subsidized; in 1962, its operating revenues of  million (equivalent to  million in ) included  million (equivalent to  million in ) of federal subsidy.

In 1960, turboprop Fairchild F-27s were introduced; piston-engine Martin 4-0-4s were added to the fleet in 1964 and removed in 1967.

One of three co-founders, Arthur G. Heyne was an attorney in St. Louis, Missouri, and served as Secretary-Treasurer starting in 1950.

The three swallows on Ozark fins represented on-time flights, referring to the legend of the swallows that return to the Mission San Juan Capistrano, in California, each year on the 19th of March.

Jets

In 1961, Ozark's network reached from Minneapolis to Nashville and from Kansas City to Indianapolis and Louisville. Denver was added in 1966 and, in 1969, the network sprouted eastward: Ozark was awarded nonstops from Champaign and Peoria to Washington Dulles, continuing to New York LaGuardia. Atlanta was added in 1978 and four Florida cities in winter 1978–1979.
In September 1966, Ozark and Central Airlines announced plans to merge, subject to CAB approval; the new airline was to retain the Ozark name and would be one of the largest local service carriers in the U.S. However, in November 1966, the two airlines announced that merger talks had ended by mutual consent due to financing difficulties.

By 1967, the Martins and F-27s were replaced with Fairchild Hiller FH-227s, a stretched F-27; Ozark was all-turbine after the last DC-3 flight in October 1968. Ozark's introduced its first jets in July, 1966 with the Douglas DC-9-10s. The DC-9-10s were later augmented with McDonnell Douglas DC-9-30s (DC-9-31/32) and McDonnell Douglas DC-9-40s. The airline also ordered two Boeing 727-200s but never took delivery.  In late 1980, Ozark retired its last FH-227 prop aircraft and went all jet with an all DC-9 fleet. Several very small cities including Burlington, Fort Dodge, and Mason City in Iowa, Decatur, Marion, and Quincy in Illinois, and Cape Girardeau, Missouri, briefly saw DC-9 jet service before Ozark discontinued serving those cities in 1982.  In 1984, larger McDonnell Douglas MD-80s were added.

Ozark Midwest
In 1985 Ozark began a code-share agreement with Air Midwest, a commuter airline operating 17-seat Fairchild Swearingen Metroliners. The operation was called Ozark Midwest and the Air Midwest aircraft were painted with green stripes, similar to Ozark but without the swallows. Ozark Midwest provided feeder service to Ozark from many smaller cities in the midwest that were not able to support large DC-9 jets including several cities that Ozark had previously discontinued.

Merger with TWA
In the mid-1980s Ozark and TWA had a de facto duopoly at St. Louis Lambert International Airport, a hub for both. Ozark accounted for 26.3 percent of boardings at STL in 1985, while TWA accounted for 56.6 percent. On , the two airlines announced plans to merge: TWA would buy Ozark for  million in cash (equivalent to  million in ).

The Ozark DC-9s were gradually painted with a modified paint scheme with "TWA" in the tail. Over the next couple of years, the fifty Ozark airplanes were repainted in the TWA livery. On , TWA was merged into American Airlines.

Second Ozark Air Lines (2000–2001)
In 1998, rights to the airline's name were purchased by William E. Stricker of Columbia, Missouri. Later in 2000, service was added to Joplin Regional Airport in Joplin, Missouri, as a stop between Columbia and Dallas/Fort Worth. In early 2001, Ozark operated to the Taos Regional Airport serving Taos, New Mexico, from Dallas/Fort Worth on two days per week during the winter ski season.

A year later, the company ceased operations and sold its assets to the now-bankrupt Great Plains Airlines, based in Tulsa, Oklahoma.

Sales and marketing

Reservations
From the 1960s through the late 1980s, Ozark Air Lines' reservations department used a special toll-free WX telephone prefix in New Jersey which could be reached only in certain areas of the state by dialing 0 and asking the New Jersey Bell operator to connect to Ozark's WX number: WX-8300. The number could not be dialed directly by the customer and was only available to certain telephone exchanges where WX was available. (Direct-dial toll-free service made WX numbers obsolete, and they have been largely phased out.)

Advertising
In the late 1960s, comedian George Carlin appeared in Ozark advertising.

Destinations in 1986

 Atlanta (Hartsfield–Jackson Atlanta International Airport)
 Baltimore (Baltimore/Washington International Thurgood Marshall Airport)
 Cedar Rapids/Iowa City (The Eastern Iowa Airport)
 Champaign/Urbana (University of Illinois Willard Airport)
 Charlotte (Charlotte/Douglas International Airport)
 Chicago (Chicago O'Hare International Airport)
 Cleveland (Cleveland Hopkins International Airport)
 Dallas/Fort Worth (Dallas/Fort Worth International Airport)
 Denver (Stapleton International Airport)
 Des Moines (Des Moines International Airport)
 Detroit (Detroit Metropolitan Wayne County Airport)
 Fort Lauderdale/Hollywood (Fort Lauderdale – Hollywood International Airport)
 Fort Myers (Southwest Florida International Airport)
 Houston (William P. Hobby Airport)
 Indianapolis (Indianapolis International Airport)
 Jacksonville (Jacksonville International Airport)
 Kansas City (Kansas City International Airport)
 Las Vegas (McCarran International Airport)
 Lincoln (Lincoln Airport)
 Louisville (Louisville International Airport)
 Madison (Dane County Regional Airport)
 Miami (Miami International Airport)
 Milwaukee (General Mitchell International Airport)
 Minneapolis/St. Paul (Minneapolis–Saint Paul International Airport)
 Moline/Quad Cities (Quad City International Airport)
 Nashville (Nashville International Airport)
 New Orleans (Louis Armstrong New Orleans International Airport)
 New York City (LaGuardia Airport)
 Norfolk (Norfolk International Airport)
 Omaha (Eppley Airfield)
 Oklahoma City (Will Rogers World Airport)
 Orlando (Orlando International Airport)
 Peoria (General Wayne A. Downing Peoria International Airport)
 Philadelphia (Philadelphia International Airport)
 Raleigh/Durham (Raleigh–Durham International Airport)
 Rochester, Minnesota (Rochester International Airport)
 San Antonio (San Antonio International Airport)
 San Diego (San Diego International Airport)
 Sarasota/Bradenton (Sarasota-Bradenton International Airport)
 Sioux City (Sioux Gateway Airport)
 Sioux Falls (Sioux Falls Regional Airport)
 Springfield, Illinois (Abraham Lincoln Capital Airport)
 St. Louis (St. Louis Lambert International Airport) (Hub)
 Tampa (Tampa International Airport)
 Tulsa (Tulsa International Airport)
 West Palm Beach (Palm Beach International Airport)
 Washington, D.C. (Ronald Reagan Washington National Airport)
 Waterloo (Waterloo Regional Airport)

Note: Regional destinations were served by Ozark Midwest

Fleet history

1959
24 – Douglas DC-3
 3 – Fairchild F-27

1965
21 – Douglas DC-3
15 – Martin 4-0-4
 7 – Fairchild F-27

1969
21 – Fairchild Hiller FH-227
 8 – Douglas DC-9-10
 9 – McDonnell Douglas DC-9-30

1973
 3 – de Havilland Canada DHC-6 Twin Otter (the Twin Otter aircraft were used to serve Chicago Meigs Field)
20 – Fairchild Hiller FH-227
 8 – Douglas DC-9-10
11 – McDonnell Douglas DC-9-30

1978
13 – Fairchild Hiller FH-227B
 8 – Douglas DC-9-10
26 – McDonnell Douglas DC-9-30

1980
13 – Fairchild Hiller FH-227B
 7 – Douglas DC-9-10
33 – McDonnell Douglas DC-9-30

1986
Ozark was an all-jet airline by this time:

 7 – Douglas DC-9-10
36 – McDonnell Douglas DC-9-30
 3 – McDonnell Douglas DC-9-40
 4 – McDonnell Douglas MD-82

Accidents and incidents
On , Ozark Air Lines Flight 965, a Douglas DC-9-15, collided in midair with a Cessna 150F while both aircraft were on approach to runway 17 at Lambert–St. Louis Municipal Airport (Lambert Field), St. Louis, Missouri.  The Cessna was demolished by the collision and ground impact, and both of its occupants were killed. The DC-9 sustained light damage and was able to land safely; none of its 44 passengers or five crewmembers were injured.
On , Ozark Air Lines Flight 982 crashed shortly after takeoff from Sioux Gateway Airport. 35 of the flight's 62 passengers and 4 crew members were taken to area hospitals, mostly for treatment of minor cuts and scratches. It was the "first crash of any significance for the airline." The  million DC-9 aircraft (equivalent to  million in ) was a total loss.
On , Ozark Air Lines Flight 809, a Fairchild Hiller FH-227B, crashed while on approach to Lambert–St. Louis International Airport. Of the 45 passengers and crew on board, only seven survived. Microburst-induced windshear and the captain's decision to land in a thunderstorm were cited as the cause.
On , Ozark Air Lines Flight 650, a McDonnell Douglas DC-9-31, struck a snow plow while landing at Sioux Falls Regional Airport. The driver of the snow plow was killed and two flight attendants suffered minor injuries. No passengers were injured.

See also 
 List of defunct airlines of the United States

References

External links

 has several Ozark timetables from 1952 to 1961, showing where they flew, how often, how long it took and how much it cost. They also have route maps for some later years.
 Video: "Ozark Air Lines, Computer Reservation System"

Airlines disestablished in 1986
Airlines established in 1950
Companies based in St. Louis County, Missouri
Defunct companies based in Missouri
Defunct regional airlines of the United States
 
Trans World Airlines